Cody Harrell Horn is an American actress and model. She has appeared in films such as Violet & Daisy (2011), Magic Mike (2012), and End of Watch (2012), and guest starred on the NBC sitcom The Office as recurring character Jordan Garfield (2011).

Life and career
Horn was born in Los Angeles and is the daughter of Cindy Horn (née Harrell), a former model and actress, and Alan F. Horn, an entertainment executive and former chairman of Walt Disney Studios. She went to Harvard-Westlake School and graduated in 2006. She has appeared on Rescue Me and guest starred on three episodes of The Office. She also played Lynetta Loski in the 2010 movie Flipped, and she starred as Michelle in the James Wan-produced horror thriller film Demonic.

Horn appeared in the film Magic Mike (2012).

Filmography

Film

Television

References

External links

Living people
21st-century American actresses
Actresses from Los Angeles
Female models from California
American film actresses
American television actresses
Harvard-Westlake School alumni
Jewish American actresses
21st-century American Jews
Year of birth missing (living people)